Prince Wolrad of Waldeck and Pyrmont (26 June 189217 October 1914) was the youngest child of George Victor, Prince of Waldeck and Pyrmont by his second wife Princess Louise of Schleswig-Holstein-Sonderburg-Glücksburg.

Early life and family
Wolrad was born at Arolsen, Waldeck and Pyrmont, the eight child and second son George Victor, Prince of Waldeck and Pyrmont (1831–1893), (son of George II, Prince of Waldeck and Pyrmont and Princess Emma of Anhalt-Bernburg-Schaumburg) but first child by his second wife, Princess Louise of Schleswig-Holstein-Sonderburg-Glücksburg (1858–1936), (daughter of Friedrich, Duke of Schleswig-Holstein-Sonderburg-Glücksburg and Princess Adelheid of Schaumburg-Lippe). Through both of his parents, he was descendant of George II of Great Britain.

Wolrad grew up without his father, who died one year after his birth. He was raised by his mother; his half brother, reigning prince Friedrich also looked after his welfare.

In 1910, he accompanied Friedrich to the funeral of King Edward VII of the United Kingdom.

His half-siblings were:
Pauline, Princess of Bentheim and Steinfurt (1855–1925) who married Alexis, Prince of Bentheim and Steinfurt
Marie, Princess William of Württemberg (1857–1882) who married the future William II of Württemberg.
Emma, Queen of the Netherlands (1858–1934) who married William III of the Netherlands.
Helena, Duchess of Albany (1861–1922) who married Prince Leopold, Duke of Albany.
Friedrich, Prince of Waldeck and Pyrmont (1865–1946), last reigning prince of Waldeck and Pyrmont.

Education and military career
He studied at New College, Oxford and Grenoble and Heidelberg (he was member of Corps Saxoborussia), but since these studies did not appear to lead to anything, it was desirable to send him to the army. He showed more interest for the army than university and soon became a lieutenant in the Hessian Dragoon Regiment and on the staff of the Eighty-third Regiment of Infantry. During the First World War he fought in Vosges and later in the Battle of the Marne. He ultimately came to Moorslede, Belgium, where he died in action. He was unmarried.

Ancestry

Notes and sources

The Royal House of Stuart, London, 1969, 1971, 1976, Addington, A. C., Reference: 352

1892 births
1914 deaths
People from Bad Arolsen
House of Waldeck and Pyrmont
German military personnel killed in World War I
Sons of monarchs